The 1993 Amílcar Cabral Cup was held in Freetown, Sierra Leone.

Group stage

Group A

Group B

Knockout stage

Semi-finals

Third place match

Final

References
Details in RSSSF archives

Amílcar Cabral Cup